Dirfi (older form Δίρφυς - Dirfys) is a mountain in the central part of the island of Euboea, Greece. At 1,743 m elevation, it is the highest mountain of Euboea. The Dirfi gave its name to the municipal unit Dirfys. Its summit  is 4 km west of Stropones, 5 km north of Steni Dirfyos and 28 km northeast of the city of Chalcis. There are forests on the lower slopes while most of the mountain is covered with grassland and in winter with permafrost and snow.

Gallery

See also
 List of European ultra prominent peaks

References

Euboea
Mountains of Greece
Mountains of Central Greece
Landforms of Euboea (regional unit)